Time Changer is an independent science fiction Christian seriocomic film written and directed by Rich Christiano, released by Five & Two Pictures in 2002. The screenplay concerns Dr. Norris Anderson (Gavin MacLeod), who uses his late father's time machine to send his colleague, Bible professor Russell Carlisle (D. David Morin), from 1890 into the early 21st century. The film had a limited nationwide release.

Plot
Bible professor Russell Carlisle (D. David Morin) confronts and lectures a boy who has stolen marbles from his neighbors, calling his action unjust.  The year is 1890 and Carlisle has written a new manuscript entitled The Changing Times, which promotes good morals without discussing Christ. The book is on track to receive a unanimous endorsement from the board of the Grace Bible Seminary. That is, until colleague Dr. Norris Anderson (Gavin MacLeod) objects. Without unanimous endorsement, his book might not do so well. Carlisle and another professor seek a unanimity rule change, but the dean insists that Carlisle discuss the disagreement with Anderson privately.

Dr. Anderson fears that Carlisle's book could harm coming generations, arguing that teaching good moral values without mentioning Christ is wrong. Using a secret time machine, Anderson sends Carlisle over 100 years into the future, offering him a glimpse of where his beliefs will lead.

Arriving in the early 21st century, Carlisle is shocked to find that half of all marriages end in divorce (instead of 5% in 1890), teenagers talk openly about deceiving their parents, films contain blasphemous language and people who go to church are so bored by the sermons that they need extra activities. He tries to convince a laundromat worker, Eddie Martinez (Paul Rodriguez), to go to church and read the Bible.  Two churchgoing men grow suspicious of Carlisle, who acts as if he is seeing everything for the first time. They confront him as he is about to be transported back to the past. As the sky grows thunderous, Carlisle seems delirious as he talks about how the second coming of Christ is drawing near. Carlisle vanishes. The men look at where he vanished and one of the men says with dread, "I think we just missed the Rapture."

Carlisle rematerializes in 1890 and excitedly tells Anderson he will revise his book. He gives the thieving boy his own set of marbles and explains that it is Jesus Christ who demands honesty. Anderson tries to learn when the world will come to an end, by trying to send a Bible to the future. The machine won't operate with a target date of 2100, so he tries with progressively earlier decades 2090, 2080 and 2070, which fail. As the film ends, he makes at least two more failed attempts, aiming earlier and earlier, suggesting that either humanity cannot know when the End comes, or that the End will come before the mid-21st century.

Cast
 D. David Morin as Russell Carlisle
 Gavin MacLeod as Norris Anderson
 Hal Linden as The Dean
 Jennifer O'Neill as Michelle Bain
 Paul Rodriguez as Eddie Martinez
 Richard Riehle as Dr. Wiseman
 John Valdetero as Tom Sharp
 Dan Campbell as Rex
 Evan Ellingson as Roger
 Crystal Robbins as Mrs. Matthews
 Patty MacLeod as Norris' Wife
 Paul Napier as Dr. Butler
 Charles Hutchins as Dr. Henry
 Callan White as Carlisle's Wife
 Ross McKerras as Pawn Shop Guy
 Ruben Madera as Bellhop
 Mike Wilson as Sam
 Arthur Roberts as Man In Pew
 Rod Britt as Pastor
 Ron Sey as Hot Dog Vendor
 Emily Trapp as Young Girl
 Brad Heller as Boutique Manager
 Alexander Polk as Security Guard
 Teresa Vidak as Waitress
 Paige Peterson as Girl In Booth
 Alana Curry as Girl In Booth
 Nan McNamara as Tom's Wife
 Cassie LaRocca as Rex's Wife
 Alfred Jackson as Student
 Michael Gier as Group Leader
 Chipper Lowell as Visitation Guy (as Chip Lowell)
 Linda Kerns as Lady Prospect
 William Bowerman as William
 Michelle Dunker as Secretary
 Kevin Downes as Greg

Production
Time Changer was Rich Christiano's first feature-length film.  In August 2001 Christiano Film Group announced the film's cast, and that shooting would begin on October 6, 2001 in Visalia, CA, for an August 2, 2002 release.
In February 2002, the website stated that the film was being edited in Los Angeles.
In March, the first rough cut was completed, work began on a second pass, and streaming video was made available.
In a press release, the theatrical release date was listed as October 4, 2002.
Editing wrapped in June, while music score, sound design, and visual effects work continued, and two scene sneak previews were linked on the website. 
On August 2, the trailer was released online. 
On August 6 the press release changed to show a theatrical release date of October 11. 
On October 4, 2002, the film was announced as "ready to go", with a theatrical poster available which showed the final release date of October 25, as did the simultaneous press release.

Releases
The film premiered in limited nationwide release on October 25, 2002. It was released on VHS and DVD in 2003; The DVD included a "making of" featurette, commentary tracks, deleted scenes, promos and the trailer. Time Changer was one of the first Christiano films offered through the Sky Angel Video On Demand service.

A 140-page tie-in novel, Time Changer (A Novel), was released in 2001, co-authored by Christiano and Greg Mitchell.

Reception
In the Charlotte Observer, Lawrence Toppman praised the acting work, but had questions about plot holes and how some of the film's premises would be accepted by Christian viewers.  Toppman wrote, "technically, the film can stand with most releases", and gave it 2.5 stars out of four.  Variety reviewer Scott Foundas described the film as "goofy fantasy hokum" with a message, one scene as "subpar", and some monologues as "distinctly uncinematic", but other scenes as "surprisingly enjoyable." Foundas found the film "hard to read" – often having "its tongue planted firmly in its cheek", but at other times "sweetly naive".  Joe Baltake of The Sacramento Bee gave 1.5 stars (of 4) to the "whimsical if predictable" film "marred by a willful single-mindedness." He found the film's beginning "interminable", and overall, "very strange".

, the film holds a 22% approval rating on Rotten Tomatoes with 2 out of 9 critics giving it a positive review with an average rating of 3.9/10.

See also

References

External links
 Official site
 
 
 
 

2002 films
2002 comedy-drama films
2002 science fiction films
Films about evangelicalism
Films directed by Rich Christiano
Films about time travel
American independent films
American science fiction films
Films produced by Kevin Downes
Films set in 1890
Films set in a movie theatre
Films set in the 21st century
2000s English-language films
2000s American films